Bogomila Welsh-Ovcharov (born 1940, Sofia) is an art historian at the University of Toronto at Mississauga and authority on the art of Vincent van Gogh. Her book Van Gogh: The Lost Arles Sketchbook, contains reproductions of sketches said to be by the artist, but the authenticity of which has been disputed.

Selected publications
The early work of Charles Angrand and his contact with Vincent van Gogh. Editions Victorine, Utrecht & Den Haag, 1971.
Vincent Van Gogh: His Paris Period, 1886-1888. Editions Victorine, Utrecht, 1976.
Vincent van Gogh and the Birth of Cloisonism. Art Gallery of Ontario, Toronto, 1981. 
Van Gogh in Provence and Auvers. Hugh Lauter Levin Associates, 1999. 
Vincent van Gogh: The Lost Arles Sketchbook. Abrams Books, 2016.

References 

1940 births
Living people
Canadian art historians
Bulgarian art historians
Chevaliers of the Ordre des Palmes Académiques
People from Sofia
Academic staff of the University of Toronto
Utrecht University alumni
Vincent van Gogh scholars
Bulgarian emigrants to Canada